The John Lennon Artificial Intelligence Project is a chatterbot designed to simulate a conversation with John Lennon. It was developed as a "Persona-Bot" by Triumph PC Online, based in Washington, D.C.  Triumph PC's "Persona-Bots" are software programs that attempt to mimic the personalities or quirks of particular historical figures in conversation.

In development since 1997, the JLAI Project (originally called the Plastic Digital Karma Project) claims to have achieved similarity to Lennon's speech patterns, but still has a way to go to achieve the seamlessness of a conversation with a real person.

References
Feature in the Evening Standard
Article in Stereophile
Article in the Austin Chronicle
Official site

Chatbots
Artificial Intelligence Project